Heudeber is a village and a former municipality in the district of Harz, in Saxony-Anhalt, Germany. Since 1 January 2010, it is part of the municipality Nordharz.  The largest company in the town is Agroservice Landhandel GmbH.

History

20th Century
On 1 November 1928 Gutsbezirk Mulmke got united with the commune of Heudeber.

21st Century
On 1 January 2010 following communes got together to the new municipality of Nordharz:
 Langeln
 Abbenrode
 Danstedt
 Schmatzfeld
 Stapelburg
 Veckenstedt
 Wasserleben
 Heudeber

Former municipalities in Saxony-Anhalt
Nordharz